Aircraft maintenance checks are periodic inspections that have to be done on all commercial and civil aircraft after a certain amount of time or usage. Military aircraft normally follow specific maintenance programmes which may, or may not, be similar to those of commercial and civil operators.

Commercial aviation
Airlines and other commercial operators of large, or turbine-powered, aircraft follow a continuous inspection program approved by the Federal Aviation Administration (FAA) in the United States, or by other airworthiness authorities such as the Transport Canada Civil Aviation Directorate (TCCA), or the European Aviation Safety Agency (EASA). Each operator prepares a Continuous Airworthiness Maintenance Program (CAMP) under its Operations Specifications or "OpSpecs".
The CAMP includes both routine and detailed inspections.

FAA Maintenance Review Board
In the United States the FAA directs that initial aircraft maintenance requirements be generated for each aircraft type in a Maintenance Review Board Report (MRBR) based on the analysis performed as outlined in ATA "MSG-3 Operator/Manufacturer Scheduled Maintenance Development" document (MSG-3 is for Maintenance Steering Group – 3rd Task Force). The MRBR is an approved set of aircraft initial maintenance requirements as prescribed by the Appendix H to para. 25.1529 of 14 CFR part 25. Modern aircraft with MSG-3-derived maintenance programs employ usage parameters —such as flight hours, calendar time, or flight cycles—for each required maintenance task included in the MRBR. This allows for more flexibility in the scheduling of maintenance to minimize aircraft downtime.

ABC check system
Airlines and airworthiness authorities casually refer to the detailed inspections as "checks", commonly one of the following: A check, B check, C check, or D check. A and B checks are lighter checks, while C and D are considered heavier checks. Aircraft operators may perform some work at their own facilities, but often checks, and especially the heavier checks, take place at maintenance, repair and overhaul (MRO) company sites.

A check
The A check is performed approximately every 400-600 flight hours, or every 200–300 flights, depending on aircraft type. It needs about 50-70 man-hours, and is usually performed in an airport hangar. The A check takes a minimum of 10 hours. The actual occurrence of this check varies by aircraft type, the flight cycle count, or the number of hours flown since the last check. The occurrence can be delayed by the airline if certain predetermined conditions are met.

B check
The B check is performed approximately every 6-8 months. It takes about 160-180 man-hours, depending on the aircraft, and is usually completed within 1–3 days at an airport hangar. A similar occurrence schedule applies to the B check as to the A check. B checks are increasingly incorporated into successive A checks, i.e. checks A-1 through A-10 complete all the B check items.

C check
The C check is performed approximately every 20–24 months, or a specific number of actual flight hours (FH), or as defined by the manufacturer. This maintenance check is much more extensive than the B check, requiring a large majority of the aircraft's components to be inspected. This check puts the aircraft out of service for 1–4 weeks. The aircraft must not leave the maintenance site until it is completed. It also requires more space than A and B checks, therefore, it is usually carried out in a hangar at a maintenance base. The effort needed to complete a C check is up to 6,000 man-hours.

3C check
Some authorities use a type of check, known as a 3C check or Intermediate Layover (IL), which typically includes light structural maintenance, including checks for corrosion, or on specific high-load parts of the airframe. The 3C check may also be used as the opportunity for cabin upgrades, e.g. new seats, entertainment systems, carpeting. This shortens the time the aircraft is out of service, by performing two distinct tasks simultaneously. As component reliability has improved, some MROs now spread the workload across several C checks, or incorporate this 3C check into D checks instead.

D check
The D check, sometimes known as a "heavy maintenance visit" (HMV), is by far the most comprehensive and demanding check for an airplane. This check occurs approximately every 6-10 years. It is a check that more or less takes the entire airplane apart for inspection and overhaul. Even the paint may need to be completely removed for complete inspection of the fuselage metal skin. Such a check can generally take up to 50,000 man-hours, and 2 months to complete depending on the number of technicians involved. It also requires the most space of all maintenance checks, and as such must be performed at a suitable maintenance base. The requirements and the tremendous effort involved in this maintenance check make it by far the most expensive, with total costs for a single D check in the million-dollar range.

Because of the nature and the cost of a D check, most airlines — especially those with a large fleet — have to plan D checks for their aircraft years in advance. Often, older aircraft being phased out of a particular airline's fleet are either stored or scrapped upon reaching their next D check, due to the high costs involved in comparison to the aircraft's value. On average, a commercial aircraft undergoes two or three D checks before being retired.

Manufacturers often underestimate the cost of the D check. Boeing underestimates the cost for four of its aircraft, and the expectation is that it has underestimated it for the B787-9 which in 2018 had not been in service for long enough to have been put through a D check.

All amounts in millions of United States dollars, as of 2018.

Comparison

References

External links 
Description of a D-check at Aerosphere
Air Transport Association
Federal Aviation Administration
FAA Flight Standards Information Management System (FSIMS)
Description of Checks in relation to the Airworthiness System on SKYbrary
 

Aircraft maintenance
Aviation safety